The rusty-margined guan (Penelope superciliaris) is a species of bird in the family Cracidae, which includes the chachalacas, guans, and curassows. It is found in Argentina, Bolivia, Brazil, and Paraguay.

Taxonomy and systematics

The International Ornithological Committee (IOC) and the Handbook of the Birds of the World taxonomies recognize the four rusty-margined guan subspecies listed in the box to the right. The Clements taxonomy does not recognize P. s. pseudonyma as separate but includes its population in the nominate subspecies. Birds in Brazil's Alagoas state are distinctive and might be a separate subspecies. The rusty-margined guan and the Marail guan (P. marail) form a superspecies.

Description

The nominate subspecies weighs  and P. s. jacupemba . The species' upperparts are dark olive to brownish with the eponymous reddish margins on the wing coverts and scapulars. The belly is also rusty. The face is pale with a supercilium whose color ranges from white to buff or ochre in the different subspecies. P. s. jacupemba paler overall than the nominate and P. s. major is darker.

Distribution and habitat

The nominate subspecies of rusty-margined guan is found in Amazonian Brazil south of the Amazon River. P. s. pseudonyma when treated separately is more westerly than the nominate sensu stricto. P. s. jacupemba is found from central and southern Brazil into eastern Bolivia. P. s. major is found in extreme souteastern Brazil, eastern Paraguay, and extreme northeastern Argentina.

The rusty-margined guan inhabits a wide variety of landscapes across its large range. Examples include the interior and edges of heavy forest, gallery forest, restinga, woodlands in cerrado grasslands, caatinga, mangroves, and Eucalyptus plantations.

Behavior

Movement

Feeding

The rusty-margined guan forages alone, in pairs, or in groups of up to 10 birds. Its diet is almost entirely fruit; one study identified the fruit of 117 plant species. It also eats small amounts of flowers, leaves, and insects.

Breeding

The rusty-margined guan's breeding season spans October to February in Argentina and August to February in southeastern Brazil; it has not been well defined elsewhere. Its nest is a platform made of sticks lined with live and dead leaves, usually built in a tree. The clutch size is three eggs.

Vocal and non-vocal sounds

The rusty-margined guan gives a wing-whirring display that has not well defined. It gives a "gruff barking" call, probably in alarm but possibly in other contexts as well.

Status

The IUCN has assessed the rusty-margined guan as being Near Threateed. It is reasonably common only in protected areas though even there poaching is a concern.

References

Further reading

External links
Rusty-margined Guan videos on the Internet Bird Collection
Rusty-margined Guan photo gallery VIREO
Photo-High Res; Article – terrabrasil.org.br-"Brazil Ecosystems"
Mangoverde description of Rusty-margined Guan
Associação Mãe-da-lua Rusty-margined Guan (Penelope superciliaris)- Photo, notes

rusty-margined guan
Birds of the Caatinga
Birds of the Cerrado
Birds of the Pantanal
Birds of Brazil
Birds of Paraguay
rusty-margined guan
Taxonomy articles created by Polbot